Añoranza is a Mexican telenovela produced by Irene Sabido for Televisa in 1979.

Cast 
Marga López
Jorge Lavat
Jaime Garza
Dolores Beristáin
María Rojo
Varelita
Erika Buenfil
José Flores

References

External links 

Mexican telenovelas
1979 telenovelas
Televisa telenovelas
Spanish-language telenovelas
1979 Mexican television series debuts
1979 Mexican television series endings